Interbank Burundi, often called Interbank, is a commercial bank in Burundi. It is licensed by the Bank of the Republic of Burundi, the national banking regulator.

The bank is a medium-sized financial services provider in Burundi, serving both individuals and businesses. , Interbank was the second largest commercial bank in Burundi, with a market-share of 25%. As of 31 December 2013, the bank's total assets were valued at BIF:304.56 billion (approx. US$198 million), with shareholders' equity of BIF:36.34 billion (approx. US$23.6 million).

History
The bank was founded in 1993 by citizens and non-citizens of Burundi, representing over ten nationalities.

Branch network
, Interbank Burundi has a network of branches in Bujumbura (the largest city and former capital of Burundi) and in the provinces. Some of the locations where the bank maintains branches include the following:

 Main Branch – 15 Avenue de l'Industrie, Bujumbura
 Marché Central Branch – Avenue d'Allemagne, Bujumbura
 Quartier Asiatique Branch – Avenue Ntahangwa, Bujumbura
 Place de l'Indépendance Branch – Avenue du Commerce, Bujumbura
 Market Branch = Bujumbura Central Market, Avenue de la Croix-Rouge, Bujumbura 
 Buyenzi Branch – 20th Avenue, Bujumbura
 Jabe Branch – Avenue de la Jeunesse, Bujumbura
 Ngozi Branch – RNG Road, Ngozi
 Kirundo Branch – Kirundo
 Gitega Branch – Gitega
 Muyinga Branch – Muyinga
 Makamba Branch – Makamba
 Rumonge Branch - Rumonge
 Kayanza Branch - Kayanza
 Bubanza Branch - Bubanza
 Masanganzira Branch - Masanganzira
 Ruyigi Branch - Ruyigi
 Cankuzo Branch - Cankuzo
 Mabanda Branch - Mabanda

See also
List of banks in Burundi
Bank of the Republic of Burundi
Economy of Burundi

References

External links
Website of Bank of the Republic of Burundi

Banks of Burundi
Banks established in 1993
Bujumbura
1993 establishments in Burundi